State Trunk Highway 124 (often called Highway 124, STH-124 or WIS 124) is a state highway in the US state of Wisconsin. It runs in north–south in west central Wisconsin from Lake Hallie to near Eagleton, in the Town of Eagle Point. The entire length of the highway is in Chippewa County. It previously extended into Eau Claire County, but the Eau Claire County section was renumbered WIS 312 as part of the US Highway 53 (US 53) bypass project in 2006.

Route description
Starting at US 53/CTH-OO at a parclo, WIS 124, as well as Business US 53 (Bus. US 53), begins traveling northwest. It then turns northeast as Bus. US 53 turns southwest. After that, it cuts through under the US 53/WIS 29 cloverleaf interchange. In Chippewa Falls, it begins to run concurrently with Bus. WIS 29 all the way to downtown. After crossing the Chippewa River, Bus. WIS 29 branches westward, ending the concurrency. Furthermore, WIS 124 becomes a one-way pair only through downtown. After leaving Chippewa Falls, it continues to travel northward through Eagle Point and Eagleton. Eventually, it intersects WIS 64 and ends.

Major intersections

See also

References

124
Transportation in Chippewa County, Wisconsin